Sphecodes monilicornis   is a Palearctic species of sweat bee.

References

External links
Images representing  Sphecodes monilicornis  

Hymenoptera of Europe
Halictidae
Insects described in 1802